Kotavan (also, Ketavan and Komavan) is a village and municipality in the Agdash Rayon of Azerbaijan.  It has a population of 938.

References 

Populated places in Agdash District